32 FM 94.9 is an Ibadan based station and Nigeria's first comedy radio station.
It is designed to create and broadcast provocative, entertaining, no-holds-barred humorous content and programs not available to listeners anywhere else on the radio. 
The station started broadcasting on the 7th of November, 2017.
It also features an Internet Radio service and also available on other internet streaming platforms. 
It is also tagged as the Fastest growing Radio Station in the South-West. On-Air Personalities of 32 FM 94.9 include Woli Agba, Alhaji Hamzat Oriyomi, MC Remote, Oluwatoyin Salau (Yellow Sisi), Adeniyi Kayode Samuel (Afouda) and a host of others.

References

2017 establishments in Nigeria